Jahanara may refer to:

 Jahanara of Palanpur (1915–2003), born Joan Falkiner, Australian-born Begum of Palanpur
 Jahanara Ahmed, Bangladeshi actress
 Jahanara Alam (born 1993), Bangladeshi cricketer
 Jahanara Begum (1614–1681), Mughal princess
 Jahan Ara Begum Surma (born 1958), Bangladesh Awami League politician
 Jahanara Begum (politician) (1942–2021), Bangladesh Nationalist Party politician
 Jahanara Begum (social worker), Bangladeshi social worker
 Jahanara Hai (born 1939), Pakistani actress
 Jahanara Imam (1929–1994), Bangladeshi writer and activist
 Ananya Jahanara Kabir, Indian literary scholar
 Jahanara Kajjan (1915–1945), also known as Kajjanbai, Indian singer and actress
 Jahanara Khan, Bangladeshi politician
 Jahanara Romney (born 1941), also known as Bonnie Beecher, American activist, singer and actress
 Jahanara Shahnawaz (1896–1979), Bangladeshi politician